Coffee Creek is an unincorporated community in Fergus County, Montana, United States. It is located along Montana Highway 81 in west central Fergus County, several miles northwest of Denton. Coffee Creek has a post office with the ZIP code 59424.

Demographics

History
A post office has been in operation in Coffee Creek since 1914. The community took its name from nearby Coffee Creek.

Coffee Creek used to be a large town before the invention of the car when railroad was the main form of transportation and then many reasons that the town tore down were like fires, supply and demand, and mostly because the invention of the car.

Notable person
Wesley L. Packard, Wisconsin businessman and legislator, was born in Coffee Creek.

Climate
This climatic region is typified by large seasonal temperature differences, with warm to hot (and often humid) summers and cold (sometimes severely cold) winters.  According to the Köppen Climate Classification system, Coffee Creek has a humid continental climate, abbreviated "Dfb" on climate maps.

References

Unincorporated communities in Fergus County, Montana
Unincorporated communities in Montana